William Kiernan (April 2, 1908 – November 19, 1973) was an American set decorator. He was nominated for six Academy Awards in the category Best Art Direction.

Selected filmography
Kiernan was nominated for six Academy Awards for Best Art Direction:
 The Solid Gold Cadillac (1956)
 Pal Joey (1957)
 The Last Angry Man (1959)
 Pepe (1960)
 The Sand Pebbles (1966)
 The Way We Were (1973)

References

External links

1908 births
1973 deaths
American set decorators
Artists from New York City